Bell Park is a large municipal park in Greater Sudbury, Ontario, Canada, located on the western shore of Ramsey Lake.

The park is named for William J. Bell, an early lumber baron in the city whose former Belrock mansion is also the site of the Art Gallery of Sudbury. The park site is part of his estate land, donated to the city by him upon his death. Two former mayors of the city are also honoured in the park grounds: the park's amphitheatre is named for Grace Hartman, and a boardwalk connecting the park to the nearby Science North site along the Ramsey Lake shoreline is named in honour of Jim Gordon.

The park has an amphitheatre, two gazebos, several flowerbeds, a monumental sculpture commemorating the city's mining heritage, a main beach (with lifeguard supervision in the summertime) and canteen, a children's playground area, washrooms at two locations in the park, and ample parking for visitors.

The park has been the site of many cultural events in the city, including the Northern Lights Festival Boréal, the Sudbury Summerfest, the city's annual dragonboat races and a summer concert series. The Bell Park Gazebo Concert Series showcases the talent of local performers in a summer concert series held at the gazebo, and is free of charge.

In 2015, the beach at Bell Park was awarded Blue Flag beach certification by the international Foundation for Environmental Education.

See also
 List of contemporary amphitheaters

References

External links

Parks in Greater Sudbury
Music venues in Ontario
Beaches of Ontario
Festival venues in Canada